Gong Shi was a policy in ancient China during the reigns of emperors Dezong and Shunzong of the Tang dynasty in which the emperor would send eunuchs to civilian markets to purchase goods by force at very low prices. This system was abolished by Reformists led by Wang Shuwen under the rule of Emperor Shunzong.

History 
Researches published by City University of Hong Kong and Fudan University show that the earliest record of Gong Shi can be traced back to 707, according to two biographic sketches of Emperor Zhongzong. At first, the Gong Shi was merely certain kind of imperial entertainment, until the period of the Emperor Xuanzong, when the entertainment tended to become a commercial practice adopted to serve the need of the palace.

Before the Zhenyuan period of the reign of Emperor Dezong, if the palace required supplies, then the officials responsible for procurement would settle the bill immediately after a purchase. Originally these officials were called The Envoy of Imperial purchasing, but later they were renamed the Envoy of Emperor's purchasing.

At that time, the purchase and management of charcoal, which was the main fuel for the imperial household, was part of the daily operations of the whole palace in the Tang dynasty. Various officials were appointed to act as The Envoy of Charcoal Purchasing. At first, the eunuchs were simply The Envoys of Emperor's purchasing, whose responsibility did not include buying charcoal, but this changed as the eunuchs' power increased during a period which saw power struggles among the officials of court, and the role of The Envoy of Charcoal Purchasing slowly merged with their existing duties. Charcoal was only one commodity among many that were plundered by the government using the Gong Shi practice.

Because of this, the imperial family started sending eunuchs to make purchases towards the end of the Zhenyuan period and the practice of purchasing goods at low prices began to develop, and even the official documents needed to permit and justify such purchases gradually vanished. Although the Expostulatory Officials often suggested that Emperor Dezong should abolish Gong Shi, he did not do so.

Implementation 

The implementation of Gong Shi basically involved shops operated by eunuchs within the palace. Taking advantage of imperial power to bully the citizens, these eunuchs would often send men to markets located at both the east and west part of the city, or the main road which was the only way people could pass to arrive at their destination, to enforce the deals. The traders received extremely poor payments and were subsequently ordered to transport their merchandise to the palace.

At the time, there could hundreds of people buying goods at low prices by force at various markets in the capital city Chang'an – often a few hundred Qian were used to purchase goods worth thousands, or, in some cases, there might be no payment at all. The civilian traders dared not resist or even ask where these officials were from, even though there were often doubts as to the identities of the purchasers.

The Chronicle of Shunzong period written by Han Yu recorded such an incident: while a peasant was going to the town carrying firewood he wanted to sell in the market, he met a eunuch claiming the firewood had already been bought by the emperor (through the Gong Shi system) and simply paying him a few chi of juan, a type of silk product. The eunuch then ordered the peasant to transport the firewood to the imperial palace using his donkey and even asked for an Entrance tip. All these demands upset the peasant; he gave the juan back and begged for mercy, but the eunuch insisted that he transport the firewood. In the end, the peasant assaulted the eunuch out of frustration and was arrested by a patrolling officer. Hearing of this event, Emperor Dezong dismissed the eunuch responsible by sending out an imperial decree and presented ten pieces of juan to the peasant.

Although historical documents recording such events in detail can hardly be found today, scholastic researches generally used the terms rob, seize, pillage or take by force in Chinese to describe the eunuchs' misdeeds negatively.

Abolition 
Shortly after his accession, Emperor Shunzong began to reappoint the Reformists, the leader of whom was Wang Shuwen. The Reformists implemented a series of policies, including the abolition of Gong Shi and the Scoundrels in the Five Workshops (:zh:五坊小兒), which acted as tools to oppress the civilian population.

Criticism  
Sinologist Chen Yinke said "Gong Shi was the worst policy in the late Emperor Dezong period" in his book the Draft of Album Verses of Yuanbai.

Han Yu wrote in the Chronicle of Shunzong period: "although called Gong Shi, it was actually a robbery."

Modern Chinese scholar Zhang Lifan said in an essay: "during his early years, Emperor Dezong knew it was wiser to be thrifty. But when grew older, he became more and more avaricious and wasteful. At the same time, the extent of civilians' sufferings from Gong Shi largely increased."

Literature 

In the poem the Old Charcoal Seller, the famous ancient Chinese poet Bai Juyi satirized the phenomenon of officials buying goods by force at low prices by Gong Shi, with a note below the title of the poem: "so suffering from the Gong Shi".

Related works 
Bai Juyi, the Old Charcoal Seller
Han Yu, the Chronicle of Shunzong period

See also 

The Scoundrels in the Five Workshops (:zh:五坊小兒), an offensive word once used to describe workers in the five imperial workshops.

Notes 
Note

References

Bibliography
 Fu Lecheng, the General history of China - the history of Sui, Tang, and the Five Dynasties and Ten Kingdoms period, Zhongwen Book Co., Ltd, 

Tang dynasty